The 2002–03 Croatian First Football League was the twelfth season of the Croatian First Football League, the national championship for men's association football teams in Croatia, since its establishment in 1992. The season started on 24 July 2002 and ended on 31 May 2003. NK Zagreb were the defending champions, having won their first championship title the previous season. Dinamo Zagreb won the title, after a win against Varteks on 17 May 2003.

Teams
The league format was changed from the previous 2001–02 season and the number of teams were reduced from sixteen to twelve for the 2002–03 Prva HNL. Because of this, the four bottom-placed teams were automatically relegated to Croatian Second Football League at the end of the season, while the 11th placed Šibenik and 12th placed Kamen Ingrad qualified for the Relegation play-offs. Both clubs then went on to win the two-legged play-off ties against second level sides Vukovar '91 and Istra Pula. Therefore, no team was promoted from the 2001–02 Croatian Second Football League and all twelve teams which contested the 2002–03 Prva HNL were also top flight members in the previous season.

Changes from last season
Teams relegated to the 2002–03 Croatian Second Football League
 13th placed: Hrvatski Dragovoljac
 14th placed: Čakovec
 15th placed: Marsonia
 16th placed: TŠK Topolovac

Summaries
The following is an overview of teams which competed in the 2002–03 Prva HNL. Manager list is correct as of 24 July 2002, first day of the season.

First stage

Rounds 1–22 results

Championship group

Rounds 23–32 results

Relegation group

Rounds 23–32 results

Relegation play-off

Top goalscorers

Source: 1.hnl.net

See also
2002–03 Croatian Second Football League
2002–03 Croatian Football Cup

External links
Season statistics at HRNogomet
2002–03 in Croatian Football at Rec.Sport.Soccer Statistics Foundation

Croatian Football League seasons
Cro
Prva Hnl, 2002-03